Cordell Cato (born July 15, 1992) is a Trinidadian footballer who last played for Oklahoma City Energy FC  in the USL Championship.

Career
On January 17, 2012 it was announced that Cato had signed with Seattle Sounders. After making 8 competitive appearances in one season, the Sounders declined to pick up a contract option on Cato.

Cato's MLS rights were traded to the San Jose Earthquakes on March 1, 2013. Cato's time with the Earthquakes came to an end when his contract expired on December 31, 2017. After his release by San Jose, he trialed with the Earthquakes' arch-rivals LA Galaxy, but ultimately was not signed.

On March 9, 2018, Cato signed with USL side Charlotte Independence for the 2018 season. He left Charlotte at the end of their 2018 season.

On January 9, 2019, Cato joined USL side OKC Energy.

International

International goals
Scores and results list Trinidad and Tobago's goal tally first.

Personal life
Cato is currently married to Trinidad and Tobago women's national football team member Jonelle Warrick.

References

External links
 
 Seattle Sounders FC profile
 

1992 births
2014 Caribbean Cup players
2015 CONCACAF Gold Cup players
2019 CONCACAF Gold Cup players
Association football forwards
Association football wingers
Charlotte Independence players
Defence Force F.C. players
Expatriate soccer players in the United States
Living people
Major League Soccer players
OKC Energy FC players
San Jose Earthquakes players
San Juan Jabloteh F.C. players
Seattle Sounders FC players
Trinidad and Tobago expatriate footballers
Trinidad and Tobago expatriate sportspeople in the United States
Trinidad and Tobago footballers
Trinidad and Tobago international footballers
USL Championship players